Michael Ian Pamment (12 May 1945 – 16 July 2006) was an English professional footballer who played as a centre forward.

Career
Born in Huddersfield, Pamment joined Bradford City from Kirkburton Youth Club in 1962. He joined the first team in July 1964, and made 1 league appearance for the club. He left the club in 1965, and later played for Emley, Mossley, Stalybridge Celtic, Bradford (Park Avenue) and Buxton.

He joined Mossley from Emley in 1970, making 40 appearances and scoring 16 goals.

Pamment represented England at youth level.

Sources

References

1945 births
2006 deaths
Footballers from Huddersfield
English footballers
England youth international footballers
Association football forwards
Bradford City A.F.C. players
Wakefield F.C. players
Mossley A.F.C. players
Stalybridge Celtic F.C. players
Bradford (Park Avenue) A.F.C. players
Buxton F.C. players
English Football League players